Zhongqing may refer to:

People
Wei Qing (died 106 BC), courtesy name Zhongqing, Western Han military general
Liu Zhongqing (born 1985), Chinese aerial skier

Places
Zhongqing Circuit, an administrative division of China under the Yuan dynasty
Zhongqing, a village in Beidou, Changhua, Taiwan
Provincial Highway 10 (Taiwan), known as Zhongqing Road for a portion of the highway in Qingshui, Taichung

Other
, a gauge of guqin strings

See also

Chung Ching, stage name of Zhang Linlin, Hong Kong actress
Chongqing, a megacity in southwest China